The Widespread Depression Jazz Orchestra was a nine-piece jazz ensemble founded in 1972 at Vermont's Marlboro College.

Initially, the group played 1950s style R&B and early rock and roll with guitars, piano, sax, bass guitar, drums, and a vocalist, but by the middle of the 1970s was operating as a big band revival group, in the style of the bands of Jimmie Lunceford, Count Basie, Duke Ellington, and Lionel Hampton. The unit moved to New York City in 1978 under the leadership of Jon Holtzman, when it recorded the first of several full-length albums. In 1980 five of its members also played on their own as a bebop group.

Holtzman - better known as The Bronx Nightingale, left the group around 1982 to start his own band and recorded his first solo album - Let's Do It.  John Hammond Sr., a big fan of Jon's, graciously volunteered to write the liner notes. After Holtzman left Michael Hashim, the group's alto saxophonist, was named leader, and the musicians broadened their repertory to include swing and bop, featuring original arrangements by band members. Manager Michael Caplin renamed the group the Widespread Jazz Orchestra. WJO played at premier jazz clubs across America and around the world, and appeared at major music festivals including North Sea, Pori, Antibes, New Orleans, Montreal, Montreux + Taormina.  Their 1985 Columbia Records album Paris Blues, was produced by Dr. George Butler.

Discography 
Widespread Depression Orchestra
 Downtown Uproar, Stash (1979); 
 Boogie in the Barnyard, Stash (1980); 
 Rockin' in Rhythm, Phontastic (nl) (Swd)  (1980); 
 Time to Jump and Shout, Stash  (1981); 

Widespread Jazz Orchestra
 Swing is the Thing, Adelphi  (1982); 
 Paris Blues, Columbia Col  (1984);

Members
At large

 Jordan Sandke, trumpet
 Tim Atherton, trombone
 Michael Hashim, soprano and alto sax, leader (1982 onwards)
 Dean Nicyper, tenor sax
 David Lillie, baritone sax
 Patrick Baron, piano
 Mike LeDonne, piano
 Roy Gerson, piano
 James Wimpfheimer, double bass
 Bill Conway, double bass
 Mark Minkler, double bass
 Bill Eldridge, drums
 John Ellis, drums, arrangement
 Charlie Braugham, drums
 Jon Holtzman, vocals, vibraphone, drums, leader (to 1982)
 Dan Barrett, trombone
 Tad Shull (de) (born 1955), tenor Sax
 Ronnie Wells, vocals
 Judy Niemack, vocals
 Bob Zuck, guitar, vocals
 Jeanne Holtzman, bass, vocals
 Nick McDougal, alto sax, guitar
 Diego Francesco Donaldo Bianco, tenor sax
 Michael Caplin, manager
 Paul Suihkonen, trumpet
 Jake Epstein, clarinet, sax, arranger
 Billy Grey, trumpet, vocals
 Jim Masters, trombone, vocals
 Randy Sandke, trumpet
 Joel Helleny, trombone
 Peter Ecklund, arranger
 John Dwight, arranger

By record

References 

 Gary W. Kennedy, "Widespread Depression Jazz Orchestra". Grove Jazz online.

Further reading
W. R. Stokes: "Uplifting Depression", Washington Post (19 April 1979)
W. R. Stokes: "The Little Big Band", Washington Post (2 March 1980)
J. S. Wilson: "Jazz: Depression Quintet", New York Times (26 Dec 1980)
C. Cioe: "Backbeat: Widespread Jazz – No Longer Depressed!", High Fidelity, vol. 33 no. 7 (1983), p. 84 (with discography)
J. S. Wilson: "A New Big Band Identity", New York Times (19 May 1988)

American jazz ensembles
Musical groups from Vermont
Musical groups established in 1972